Bolszewka is a river in Poland, a tributary of the Reda near Bolszewo, Pomeranian Voivodeship.

See also
Gościcina

1Bolszewka
Rivers of Poland
Rivers of Pomeranian Voivodeship